"Rich Man" is the ninth single from the Dutch group Ten Sharp, released in March 1992. The music is composed by Niels Hermes and the lyrics are written by Ton Groen. There was no official video shot for this single.

The B-side "You" (acoustic version) was recorded in the Bullet Sound Studios on February 4, 1992.

There are actually two versions of "Rich Man": The CD-version of Under the Water-Line plays the regular and best-known version, while the LP plays an early version. Notable on this version is the absence of Hugo de Bruin's guitar-part and another brass-arrangement. This version is half a minute longer.

Track listings
 7" single
 "Rich Man" - 4:19
 "Rich Man" (Instrumental version) - 4:03

 CD-single
 "Rich Man" - 4:19
 "You" (Acoustic version) - 3:59
 "All In Love Is Fair" - 3:57
 "Rich Man" (Instrumental version) - 4:03

Credits
 Vocals: Marcel Kapteijn
 Instruments and programming: Niels Hermes
 Additional drums on "Rich Man": Rob Jansen
 Horns on "Rich Man": Stylus Horns
 Photography by Roy Tee
 Produced by Michiel Hoogenboezem and Niels Hermes
 Recorded and mixed at Spitsbergen Studios and Wisseloord Studios

References

External links
 "Rich Man" on Discogs.com
 The official Ten Sharp website

1992 singles
Ten Sharp songs
1991 songs
Columbia Records singles